Eupithecia catalinata is a moth in the family Geometridae first described by James Halliday McDunnough in 1944. It is found in the southern United States, including Utah, Arizona and New Mexico.

The wingspan is about 23 mm. The forewings are fawn brown with a distinct yellowish tinge. Adults have been recorded on wing in July and August.

References

Moths described in 1944
catalinata
Moths of North America